Scholten is an unincorporated community in northeast Barry County, Missouri, United States, located approximately  northeast of Cassville. Scholten is located on Missouri Route D one mile north of Wheelerville and Missouri Route 248.

A post office called Scholten was established in 1886, and remained in operation until 1919. The community has the name of the local Scholten family.

References

External links
Map of Scholten, Missouri on Mapquest

Unincorporated communities in Barry County, Missouri
Unincorporated communities in Missouri